Irina Mikhailovna Raievskya (18 August 1892 – 22 January 1955), was a Russian and German noble. She was Duchess of Mecklenburg by her marriage to her second husband, George, Duke of Mecklenburg, who was the head of the House of Mecklenburg-Strelitz from 1934 until his death in 1963. Irina was the great-grandmother of Sophie, Princess of Prussia, wife of Georg Friedrich, Prince of Prussia, current head of the House of Hohenzollern.

Early life
She was born on 18 August 1892 in Tsarskoye Selo, Saint Petersburg, Russian Empire, into the highest ranks of Russian nobility. Her parents were Mikhail Nikolaievich Rayevsky (Kerch, 15 February 1841 – Sevastopol, 10/24 October 1893) and wife (Saint Petersburg, 23 April 1971) Princess Mariya Grigoryevna Gagarina (Tbilisi, 2/16 June 1851 – Cannes, 2 August 1941). Her paternal grandparents were Nikolai Nikolaievitch Rayevsky (Moscow, 14 September 1801 – Krasnenjkaia, 24 ... 1843, son of Nikolai Nikolaievich Rayevsky and wife Sophia Konstantinovna ...) and wife (22 January 1839) Anna Mikhailovna Borozdina (29 December 1819 – Krasnenjkaia, 10 December 1883). Her maternal grandparents were Prince Grigori Grigorievich Gagarin (Saint Petersburg, 29 April/11 May 1810 – Châtellerault, 30 January 1893/1899) and second wife (29 August 1848) Sophia Andreievna Dashkova (Saint Petersburg, 25 June/7 July 1822 – Saint Petersburg, 7/20 December 1908, daughter of Andrei Vassilievich Dashkov and wife Anastasia Petrovna Dmitrieva-Mamonova). Her great-grandparents were Prince Grigori Ivanovich Gagarin (17/29 March 1782 - Tegernsee, 12 February 1837, son of Prince Ivan Sergeievich Gagarin and wife ...) and wife (Saint Petersburg, 1809) Ekaterina Petrovna Soimonova (Saint Petersburg, 23 May 1790 - Moscow, 11 March 1873, daughter of Pyotr Alexandrovich Soimonov and wife Ekaterina Ivanovna Boltina). Irina was daughter of the Rayevski family, who were one of the heirs of the famed Grigori Potemkin (1739–1791), Prince of Tauria, descending from the childless Prince's sister Maria Alexandrowna Potemkina (1726–1774).

Marriages and children
Irina Mikhailovna Raievskya was married firstly in Saint Petersburg, Russian Empire, on 5 November 1915 to Count Alexander Mikhailovich Tolstoy (1888–1918), son of Count Michael Tolstoy (1845-1913) and his wife Princess Olga Alexandrovna Vassiltchikov. The children of her first marriage were: 
 Countess Irina Aleksandrovna Tolstoya (1917–1998); married Franz Ferdinand, Prince of Isenburg (1901–1956).They were the grandparents of Princess Sophie (born 1978, wife of Prince Georg Friedrich of Prussia current Head of House of Hohenzollern) and Archduchess Katharina (born 1971, wife  of Archduke Martin of Austria Este)
 Count Mikhaïl Alexandrovitch Tolstoy (1918–2004); married Francine Paule Yvonne Bregentzer (1923–2009)

After Irina was widowed on 2 October 1918, she was married secondly in Geneva, Switzerland, on 7 October 1920 to George, Duke of Mecklenburg (1899-1963), son of Duke Georg Alexander of Mecklenburg-Strelitz (1859–1909) and his wife, Natalia Feodorovna Vanljarskaya, Countess of Carlow (1858–1921). The children of her second marriage were: 
 Georg Alexander, Duke of Mecklenburg (1921–1996); married Archduchess Ilona of Austria (1927–2011)
 Duke Alexander of Mecklenburg (born and died 1922)
 Duchess Helene of Mecklenburg (1924–1962); married Hassan Sayed Kamil, an Egyptian-Swiss arms dealer (1918–1991). She was killed in a plane crash.
 Duke Carl Gregor of Mecklenburg (1933–2018); married Princess Maria Margarethe of Hohenzollern (1928–2006), daughter of Franz Joseph, Prince of Hohenzollern-Emden.

Later life
She fled with her family after October Revolution from Russian Empire first to France then to Denmark and last to Germany. With her second husband, George, Duke of Mecklenburg, she lived since 1923 in Schloss Remplin, Germany until it burned down in the Second World War on 10 April 1940. Subsequently, the family moved to Grunewald, Berlin. After their house in Grunewald was destroyed by bombing in February 1944, they moved by invitation of Margarete of Hohenzollern in March 1944 to Sigmaringen. Her second husband, George, Duke of Mecklenburg, was held prisoner by the Nazi government from 1944 until he was released in February 1945.

Irina and her second husband were interested in art and music.

She died on 22 January 1955 in Sigmaringen, and was buried in the Einsiedlerkapelle, Inzigkofen, Germany.

Her second husband converted to Catholicism in 1920. After he was widowed on 22 January 1955, he married his second wife, Archduchess Charlotte of Austria (1921-1989), on 21 July 1956 in Pöcking. She was the daughter of Emperor Charles I of Austria (1887-1922) and his wife, Empress Zita of Bourbon-Parma (1892-1989).
George died in Sigmaringen of a heart attack. He was succeeded as head of the Grand Ducal House by his eldest son, Duke Georg Alexander.

Duchess of Mecklenburg
On 6 December 1934, Charles Michael, Duke of Mecklenburg, uncle of her husband George died, and George succeeded him as head of the House of Mecklenburg-Strelitz.

On 18 December 1950 the House of Mecklenburg-Schwerin confirmed the decisions made in 1929 regarding George's title, and he assumed the style of Highness while his status as head of the House of Mecklenburg-Strelitz was also confirmed. At the same time, the Count of Carlow title was abolished.

Ancestry

References

External links
Irina Mikhailovna Raievskya | House of Mecklenburg-Strelitz

|-

|-

Irina
Irina
1892 births
1955 deaths
Tolstoy family
Gagarin family
19th-century nobility
20th-century nobility
Grand Duchesses of Mecklenburg-Strelitz
White Russian emigrants to Germany